Aquamyces is a genus of fungi belonging to the family Aquamycetaceae.

Species:
 Aquamyces chlorogonii (Serbinow) Letcher

References

Fungi